2013–14 West Bank First League is the 7th season in the 2nd tier of football in Palestine. Shabab Yatta and Shabab Dura are the champions.

See also
Football in the State of Palestine

1st stage

References

West Bank First League
2013–14 in Palestinian football
West Bank